Bagher is the Persian equivalent of the Arabic name Bakr. People named Bagher include:

 Mohammad Bagher Ghalibaf (born 1961), Iranian politician and military officer
 Bagher Larijani (born 1961), Iranian politician
 Bagher Moazen (born 1948), Iranian-Canadian classical guitarist and composer
 Bagher Najafi (1948-2002), Iranian scholar of Iranian Studies
 Mohammad Bagher Sadeghi (born 1989), Iranian footballer

Arabic masculine given names